Montatheris is a monotypic genus created for the viper species, Montatheris hindii, which also known by the common names Kenya mountain viper, Kenya montane viper, montane viper, and Hind's viper. Like all other vipers, M. Hindii is venomous. This is a small terrestrial species endemic to Kenya. There are no subspecies which are currently recognized as being valid.

Etymology
The specific name, hindii, is in honor of Sidney Langford Hinde, a British military medical officer and naturalist.

Description
The head is elongated and not very distinct from the neck, while the eyes are small and set in a rather forwards position. The dorsal scales are strongly keeled.

Geographic range
Montatheris hindii is known only from isolated populations at high altitudes on Mount Kenya and the moorlands of the Kinangop Plateau, Aberdare Mountains.

The type locality listed is "Fort Hall, Kenya District, 4000 ft.". Since Fort Hall is at an altitude of only 4000 feet (1219 m), Loveridge (1957) questioned whether this was accurate.

Habitat
It favors clumps of bunch grass for cover.

Behavior
A terrestrial species, because of the low nighttime temperatures in its native habitat, M. hindii is only active during the day and when there is enough sunlight to warm its environment.

Feeding
Montatheris hindii feeds on chameleons, skinks, and small frogs. It may also take small rodents.

Reproduction
This species M. hindii is apparently viviparous (ovoviviparous). One wild-caught female produced two young in late January, while another gave birth to three in May.

References

Further reading

Andrén C (1976). "The reptile fauna in the lower alpine zone of Aberdare Mountains and Mt. Kenya". British Journal of Herpetology 5 (7): 566-575.
Boulenger GA (1910). "Descriptions of Four new African Snakes in the British Museum". Ann. Mag. Nat. Hist., Eighth Series 5: 512-513. (Vipera hindii, new species, p. 513).
Broadley DG (1996). "A review of the tribe Atherini (Serpentes: Viperidae), with the descriptions of two new genera". African Journal of Herpetology 45 (2): 40-48. (Montatheris, new genus).
Loveridge A (1957). "Check List of the Reptiles and Amphibians of East Africa (Uganda ; Kenya ; Tanganyika ; Zanzibar)". Bull. Mus. Comp. Zool., Harvard College 117 (2): 151-362. (Vipera hindii, pp. 300–301).
Marx H, Rabb GB (1965). "Relationships and Zoogeography of the Viperine Snakes (Family Viperidae)". Field Zoology 44 (21): 161-206.

External links
 

Endemic fauna of Kenya
Viperinae
Monotypic snake genera
Reptiles described in 1910